Ninety-six Guggenheim Fellowships were awarded in 1945. Thirty-six of these were postservice fellowships given to artists and scholars unable to apply in previous years due to the war.

1945 U.S. and Canadian Fellows

1945 Latin American and Caribbean Fellows

See also
 Guggenheim Fellowship
 List of Guggenheim Fellowships awarded in 1944
 List of Guggenheim Fellowships awarded in 1946

References

1945
1945 awards